Sirhowy railway station was a station on the Sirhowy Railway. It served Sirhowy near the of Tredegar.

History

The station was opened on 19 June 1865 by the Sirhowy Railway after the conversion of the Sirhowy Tramroad to a standard gauge railway. It was closed to passenger traffic on 13 June 1960. The line from Sirhowy to Tredegar continued in operation for goods traffic until closure on 4 November 1963.

Present day

The route has been reused by the modern A4048 road; there are no remains of the station at the site.

Notes

References

Route

Former London and North Western Railway stations
Railway stations in Great Britain opened in 1865
1865 establishments in Wales
Disused railway stations in Blaenau Gwent
Railway stations in Great Britain closed in 1960
1960 disestablishments in Wales